Batin may refer to:

People
Abdul Batin Jaunpuri (1900–1973), Indo-Bangladeshi Islamic scholar
Khandaker Abdul Baten (1946–2019), Tangail politician
Abdul Baten Mojumdar Komol (born 1987), retired Bangladeshi footballer
Abdul Baten, Barisal politician
Abdul Batin Khandakar, Assam politician

Places
 Batin (Posušje), a village near Posušje, West Herzegovina Canton, Bosnia and Herzegovina
 Al-Batin F.C., a football club based in Hafar al-Batin, Saudi Arabia
 Wadi al-Batin, an intermittent river in Saudi Arabia and Kuwait
 Batin, Bulgaria, a village in Borovo, Ruse Province, Bulgaria
 Batin, a village in Unguraş Commune, Cluj County, Romania

Other uses
 Al-Batin, a name of God in Islam, meaning "Hidden" or "Unmanifest"
 Batin (Islam), the interior or hidden meaning of the Quran
 Batin (surname)
 Batin people, an ethnic group in Jambi Province on the island of Sumatra, Indonesia

See also
 Batiniyya, an esoteric sect of Shi'i Islam
 Battle of Wadi al-Batin 
 Gunung Batin Airport in Astraksetra, South Sumatra, Indonesia
 Hafar al-Batin, a city in Saudi Arabia
 Hafr Al-Batin College of Technology
 Umm Batin, a Bedouin village in Israel